The list of Florida hurricanes from 1975 to 1999 encompasses 83 Atlantic tropical cyclones that affected the U.S. state of Florida. Collectively, tropical cyclones in Florida during the time period resulted in at least $45 billion (2008 USD) in damage, primarily from Hurricane Andrew. Additionally, tropical cyclones in Florida were directly responsible for 54 fatalities during the period. The 1985 season was the year with the most tropical cyclones affecting the state, with a total of eight systems. Every year included at least one tropical cyclone affecting the state.

The strongest hurricane to hit the state during the time period was Hurricane Andrew, which was one of only four Category 5 hurricanes to strike the United States. Andrew, at the time, was the costliest tropical cyclone in United States history. Additionally, Hurricane Eloise and Hurricane Opal hit the state as major hurricanes.

1975–1979

1975
June 27, 1975- The tropical depression that later becomes Tropical Storm Amy drops light rainfall in the eastern portion of the state.
July 29, 1975- A tropical depression moves into southern Mississippi after creating a strong convergence zone with a ridge over the western Atlantic Ocean. The convergence zone produces heavy rainfall of up to  along the western Florida Panhandle, resulting in moderate stream flooding and $8.5 million in damage in the state (1975 USD, $34 million 2008 USD).

Damage in the state totals $100 million (1975 USD, $400 million 2008 USD).
October 1, 1975- A tropical depression hits the western Florida Panhandle, though its effects, if any, are unknown.
October 16, 1975- Southern Louisiana is struck by a tropical depression, with its outer rain squalls and slightly above normal tides reaching the northwestern portion of Florida.

1976
May 23, 1976- Subtropical Storm One strikes near Saint Marks, producing slightly above normal tides, minor beach erosion, and beneficial precipitation.
June 11, 1976- A tropical depression moves northeastward across the southern portion of the state, resulting in only minor effects.
The rainfall led to flooding and road closures near Miami.
September 13, 1976- The combination of a mid-level low and a stationary front lead to the development of Subtropical Depression Three over the center of the state. It tracks north-northeastward and intensifies into a subtropical storm, though its effects in the state, if any, are unknown.

1977
August 27, 1977- The precursor tropical disturbance of Hurricane Anita crosses the state and drops light precipitation.

September 5, 1977- The outer rainbands of Hurricane Babe produce moderate rainfall throughout the state as it makes landfall on southern Louisiana.

1978
June 22, 1978- A tropical depression dissipates shortly after striking the southwestern portion of the state. Damage, if any, is unknown.

1979
July 11, 1979- Hurricane Bob hits southern Louisiana, with its outer rainbands dropping  of rain along the western Florida Panhandle.
The hurricane causes five casualties in the state.
September 12, 1979- Hurricane Frederic makes landfall near the Alabama/Mississippi border, having produced tropical storm force winds in the Dry Tortugas a few days before. The hurricane drops rainfall throughout the state and kills one person off Pensacola when a person is swept from their boat.
September 24, 1979- The remnants of Hurricane Henri bring rainfall and river flooding to the western portion of the state.

1980–1989

1980

The threat of the large hurricane prompts the National Hurricane Center to issue gale warnings for the Florida Keys. The hurricane produces gale-force winds across the keys, though there was no significant damage.
November 8–12, 1980- An inflow band from Hurricane Jeanne over the central Gulf of Mexico combines with a stationary cold front, producing torrential rainfall across southern Florida.
November 18, 1980- A tropical depression brings moderate precipitation to the state after merging with Hurricane Jeanne.

1981
August 17, 1981- Tropical Storm Dennis makes landfall on the southwest portion of the state, and drifts northeastward across the state. The rainfall is generally beneficial, though totals of over  cause moderate flooding damage in southeastern Florida, including $15 million ($36 million 2008 USD) in crop damages in Dade County.
November 1981- An unnamed subtropical storm produces coastal flooding and beach erosion along the eastern coastline while located over the open Atlantic Ocean.

1982
The hurricane produces tornadic activity across the state, and the storm results in generally minor damage.
June 18, 1982- A subtropical storm makes landfall near Yankeetown, and produces moderate precipitation of up to  near DeSoto City. The rainfall leads to 3 deaths, and damage from the storm totals to $10 million (1982 USD, $22 million 2008 USD).

1983
August 28, 1983- Tropical Depression Barry makes landfall as a tropical depression near Melbourne.

1984
September 27, 1984- Tropical Storm Isidore makes landfall on Jupiter with  winds. Isidore kills one person and causes $1 million in damage (1984 USD, $2.1 million 2008 USD) across the state.
October 26, 1984- A tropical depression crosses the state without dropping much precipitation.

1985
Despite the rainfall, damage is minimal.
Elena causes a  storm surge near Apalachicola, where the oyster industry experiences severe losses from the hurricane.

October 10, 1985- Minimal Tropical Storm Isabel hits extreme northeastern Florida, dropping light rain along its path; damage is minor.
Late October 1985- Hurricane Juan moves erratically over the northern Gulf of Mexico and hits Pensacola as a tropical storm.
Just two months after Hurricane Elena affected the area, the passage of Hurricane Kate causes further damage to oyster beds, leaving many people without employment. Kate causes $300 million (1985 USD, $600 million 2008 USD) in damage and three deaths in the state.

1986
August 13, 1986- The precursor disturbance that later becomes Hurricane Charley moves over northwestern Florida, causing light to moderate amounts of precipitation of up to  near Steinhatchee.

1987
August 14, 1987- A tropical depression enters the Florida Panhandle from the northwest.

1988
August 4, 1988- Tropical Storm Beryl forms to the south of Mississippi and moves slowly for several days over coastal areas of Louisiana.
September 4, 1988- Tropical Depression Ten strikes Louisiana, producing moderate rainfall across northern Florida with totals of over  near Apalachicola.
The hurricane also spawns several tornadoes.
September 13, 1988- Squalls from the enormous Hurricane Gilbert bring rain to South Florida as the storm lashed the Cayman Islands in the western Caribbean.
November 23, 1988- Tropical Storm Keith makes landfall near Sarasota as a  tropical storm. Keith produces 2 tornadoes, and overall damage from the storm totals $3 million (1988 USD, $5.5 million 2008 USD).

1989
September 22, 1989- Hurricane Hugo makes landfall on South Carolina, dropping trace amounts of rainfall in Jacksonville.

1990–1999

1990

May 25, 1990- Tropical Depression One passes to the southwest of the state, producing  of rainfall in Royal Palm Beach with its convection located primarily to the east of the center.
July 1990- Rip currents from Hurricane Bertha kill two surfers in northern Florida.
October 9, 1990- Hurricane Klaus dissipates to the east of the state, though its remnants result in moderate winds throughout the state and rough seas in eastern Florida. Klaus causes beach erosion and heavy rain squalls, as well.
October 12, 1990- Tropical Depression Marco makes landfall near Cedar Key after paralleling the coast as a tropical storm. It drops moderate precipitation throughout the state which peaks at over  near Saint Petersburg.

1991

1992
The rainfall causes over $2.1 million in damage (1992 USD) and 2 deaths.

The winds destroy 25,524 homes and damage 101,241 others in southern Florida, leaving up to one-quarter million people temporarily homeless. In Homestead, more than 99% of all mobile homes are completely destroyed. Hurricane Andrew causes $25.5 billion in damage (1992 USD, $39.2 billion 2008 USD) in south Florida and 15 direct deaths. At the time, Andrew was the costliest North Atlantic hurricane in the history of the United States, though has since dropped to eighth after Hurricanes Katrina, Ike, Irma, Maria Sandy, Ida and Harvey.

1993

1994
July 3, 1994- Tropical Storm Alberto makes landfall near Destin, dropping moderate rainfall across the state including over  along the Florida Panhandle. Heavy rainfall throughout the area results in extensive flooding, with the Apalachicola and Chipola Rivers exceeding a 100-year flood event. 300,000 chickens and 90% of the oyster crop in Apalachicola Bay perish. Damage in Florida totals $80 million (1994 USD, $116 million 2008 USD)).
The storm results in $6.9 million in damage (1994 USD).
October 2, 1994- The remnants of Tropical Depression Ten produces rough seas and heavy rainfall, flooding roads and homes in western Florida. Damage totals $5 million (1994 USD, $7.3 million 2008 USD).
November 16, 1994- Tropical Storm Gordon makes landfall near Fort Myers. The rainfall results in heavy agricultural damage, and throughout the state Gordon causes 8 casualties and around $400 million in damage (1994 USD, $582 million 2008 USD).

1995

June 5, 1995- Tropical Storm Allison first strikes near Alligator Point and later near Saint Marks. Allison produces a  storm surge in Apalachee Bay as well as scattered tornadoes, with damage amounting to $860,000 (1995 USD, $1.2 million 2008 USD).
Thousands of homes are damaged near the hurricane's two landfalls, with monetary damage totaling about $700 million (1995 USD, $990 million 2008 USD). Rip currents kill a surfer off Palm Beach County, and two people die in the Gulf of Mexico when their boat capsizes.
August 23, 1995- Tropical Storm Jerry makes landfall near Jupiter and drops heavy rainfall throughout the state which peaks at  near Naples. Freshwater flooding from the rainfall damages 340 homes in Collier County, with damage amounting to $20.5 million (1995 USD, $29 million 2008 USD).
The hurricane drops moderate rainfall across much of the state, and a tornado spawned by Opal kills one person — the only direct casualty in the state from the hurricane. Strong winds and rough seas damage or destroy large portions of coastal towns along the Florida Panhandle, with serious damage extending eastward to Apalachicola. At the time, Opal is the third costliest tropical cyclone in the United States, with damage totaling over $1 billion (1995 USD) in Florida.

1996
Two people drown in rip currents in Miami Beach, and one pilot dies indirectly due to the storm when an evacuating military jet crashes into a house.
September 2, 1996- Large swells from Hurricane Fran in the open Atlantic Ocean knock five people out of a fishing boat off Jupiter Inlet; all are rescued.
A tornado in Edgewater severely damages 30 houses, with the storm surge resulting in widespread coastal flooding.

1997

1998
Two people die as a result of a boat being capsized off Panama City, and damage in Florida totals $70 million (1998 USD, $93 million 2008 USD).
September 25, 1998 – Hurricane Georges passes over Key West as a Category 2 hurricane, and days later it moves eastward through the Florida Panhandle after hitting Biloxi, Mississippi. There, Georges damages 1,363 homes and destroys 173 houses, with damage amounting to $270 million (1998 USD) in the Keys. In the Florida Panhandle, the storm drops  of rain in Munson and results in $70 million in damage (1998 USD, $93 million 2008 USD).
The storm spawns five tornadoes, injuring 65 people and damaging or destroying 645 homes. Two people die in Monroe County when their respective fishing boats capsize, and damage in the state amounts to $40 million (1998 USD, $53 million 2008 USD).

1999
August 29, 1999- High surf from Hurricane Dennis paralleling the east coast of Florida causes four fatalities.
At least 330 homes are damaged by fallen trees, and rough surf results in heavy beach erosion. Monetary damage totals $61 million (1999 USD, $79 million 2008 USD).
Damage from Harvey totals $15 million (1999 USD, $19 million 2008 USD).
The rainfall led to flooding which isolated thousands. Five people are electrocuted from the floodwaters, and three people drown when driving into flooded canals. Damage in the state amounts to $800 million (1999 USD).

Monthly statistics

Deadly storms
The following is a list of hurricanes with known deaths in Florida between 1975 and 1999.

See also

References

 1975
1970s in Florida
1980s in Florida
1990s in Florida
Florida 1975
Florida 1975
Hurricanes